The Taça da Liga Feminina of football is a league cup competition in Portugal. It is due to start during the 2019–20 season involving the top four teams at the end of the first half of the Campeonato Nacional.
It is scheduled to start in January and feature a round-robin format with each team playing the other only once and the best two playing a final in March.

Format
Since the 2019–20 season, the Taça da Liga format is the following:

 First round – One group of four teams, which include the first four teams of the first half of Campeonato Nacional, play in a single round-robin format. The first two qualify for the final phase 
 Final phase – Final played as one-legged fixture played in a neutral ground.

Finals

Participating clubs

References

Port
Women's football competitions in Portugal
Recurring sporting events established in 2020
Football cup competitions in Portugal
2020 establishments in Portugal